1x Band was a musical band active from 1991 to 1997. It represented Slovenia for the first time at the Eurovision Song Contest 1993. Their singer, Cole Moretti, sang the song Tih deževen dan, which finished in 22nd place, scoring 9 points.

References

Eurovision Song Contest entrants for Slovenia
Eurovision Song Contest entrants of 1993